Annie Elizabeth Brewer (21 November 1874 – 30 January 1921) also known as Nancy, was a British nurse. She served in France throughout the First World War, often close to the front line, being injured in a shellfire attack. She was awarded the Legion d'Honneur and the Croix de Guerre. She also received the British War Medal and Victory Medal from the British Government but, since her death in 1921, has not been recognised by a Commonwealth War Graves Commission gravestone.

Background 
Annie Brewer was born in Newport, South Wales, on 21 November 1874. At the age of 24 she qualified as a nurse of 'insane persons' and worked in hospitals around Britain including in London and Chester, before travelling around Europe as a personal nurse and companion.

War record 
While in Paris in 1914, war broke out and she joined the French nursing and ambulance services, the Fondation Baye, serving at the Marne, the Somme and Verdun. She helped with 229 operations in 7 days at the battle of Verdun. On one occasion the ambulance in which she was travelling was shelled and she was wounded in the head and leg. She also came under shellfire while working in a French hospital. The strain led to a period of serious illness, but she insisted on returning to duty once she recovered.

Marriage 
She married French ambulance driver Daniel Mistrick, on the Verdun battlefield according to French genealogy sources. After the war she remained in Europe, working at a feeding station in Germany with the French army of occupation.

Death 
In 1921, she returned to Newport to nurse her ailing mother at 23 West Street, but was herself seriously ill and died of kidney disease, Bright's disease, on 30 January 1921 aged 46. Although she is buried at St. Woolos cemetery, she currently does not have a war grave. Gwent Western Front Association are campaigning for the Commonwealth War Graves Commission to put her on their register.

Commemoration 

Ian Brewer, Annie's great nephew, has researched the life of Annie Brewer, published on BBC Cymru. She was also featured in BBC Wales television documentary Annie's War: A Welsh Nurse on the Western Front. The Western Front Association unveiled a blue plaque on West Street with guests including members of Mrs. Mistrick's family, Health Minister Vaughan Gething and pupils from St. Woolos primary school, on 30 January 2018.

References

External links

Welsh nurses
Recipients of the Croix de Guerre 1914–1918 (France)
Female recipients of the Croix de Guerre (France)
Recipients of the Legion of Honour
Female nurses in World War I
1874 births
1921 deaths
Burials in Wales